The Formula Renault Northern European Cup (formerly Formula Renault 2.0 NEC) was a Formula Renault 2.0 championship originally held in Northern Europe (Germany, Netherlands and Belgium), but has expanded over the years to the whole of Europe. The series was created in 2006 to merge the Formula Renault 2.0 Germany created in 1991 and the Formula Renault 2.0 Netherlands created in 2003. The series was due to be rebranded as FormulaNEC but was folded prior 2019 due to lack of interest from drivers.

The Formula Renault NEC is organised by its promoter MdH Consultants AG. In 2007, a Winter Cup, the first off-season championship of this series, was organised in December, in Hockenheim and Oschersleben. The winner got a free entry for the 2008 NEC season.

The cars use Tatuus chassis and the 2.0 L Renault Clio engines like other Formula Renault 2.0 series. Michelin is the tyre supplier.

Points are allowed as following : 30 for the winner, 24 for the 2nd, 20 for the 3rd, then 17, 16, 15... until 1 for the 20. Only classified drivers are awarded by points.

A secondary class, the Formula Renault 2.0 Northern European Cup FR2000, was first contested in 2010.

Champions

Formula Renault 2.0 Germany

Formula Renault 2.0 Netherlands

Formula Renault 2.0 Northern European Cup

Formula Renault Northern European Cup

References

External links
 

Northern Europe
Recurring sporting events established in 2006
Recurring sporting events disestablished in 2018